Kornacki (feminine: Kornacka; plural: Kornaccy) is a surname. Notable people with the surname include:
Alan S. Kornacki (born 1952), American geologist
Ryszard Kornacki (born 1940), Polish poet and writer
Steve Kornacki (born 1979), American journalist, writer and television host
Helena Boguszewska (Helena Boguszewska-Kornacka) (1886-1978), Polish writer

See also
 

Polish-language surnames